Jonatan Valle Trueba (born 30 December 1984) is a Spanish former professional footballer who played as a midfielder.

He made his La Liga debut with Racing de Santander at the age of 18, going on to appear in 82 competitive games for the club. He added 114 matches and seven goals in Segunda División over five seasons, in representation of four teams.

Club career
Valle was born in Santander. A youth product of Racing de Santander, he first appeared in La Liga on the final matchday of the 2002–03 season, playing 11 minutes in a 2–3 home loss against CA Osasuna. He was promoted to the first team for the following campaign, but would never be an undisputed starter. On 20 December 2003, he scored a late penalty in a 2–2 draw at Atlético Madrid.

After spending 2006–07 on loan to Segunda División side Málaga CF, Valle returned to Santander, playing almost no part in the Cantabrians first-ever qualification to the UEFA Cup after finishing sixth (only eight matches, one start). For the 2008–09 season he was loaned again, to SD Ponferradina in the Segunda División B.

In July 2009, Valle was bought by CD Castellón, with Racing retaining an option to reacquire the player. However, merely five months later, he returned to Ponferrada on loan until the end of the campaign, contributing with 11 starts and three goals as the club returned to the second level after a three-year absence.

In the following six years, Valle alternated between his country's second and third tiers, also having a very brief spell in the Russian Premier League with FC Rubin Kazan. On 8 February 2017, the 32-year-old free agent signed with amateurs Bergantiños CF.

Club statistics

Honours
Ponferradina
Segunda División B: 2009–10

Rubin Kazan
Russian Cup: 2011–12

References

External links

1984 births
Living people
Spanish footballers
Footballers from Santander, Spain
Association football midfielders
La Liga players
Segunda División players
Segunda División B players
Tercera División players
Rayo Cantabria players
Racing de Santander players
Málaga CF players
SD Ponferradina players
CD Castellón footballers
CD Leganés players
Recreativo de Huelva players
CD Lugo players
Burgos CF footballers
Russian Premier League players
FC Rubin Kazan players
Spain youth international footballers
Spain under-21 international footballers
Spanish expatriate footballers
Expatriate footballers in Russia
Spanish expatriate sportspeople in Russia